This is a list of television programs currently broadcast (in first-run or reruns), scheduled to be broadcast, or formerly broadcast on Çufo, an Albanian television channel. The channel was launched on December 18, 2006, and airs a mix of animated and live-action programming.

Current programming

Acquired series

Anime

Anime 
 The Batman
 Batman Beyond
 Batman: The Brave and the Bold
 Ben 10
 Ben 10: Alien Force
 Ben 10: Ultimate Alien
 Camp Lazlo
 Chowder
 Cow and Chicken
 Codename: Kids Next Door
 Courage the Cowardly Dog
 Dexter's Laboratory
 Dragon Ball GT
 Dragon Ball Super
 Ed, Edd n Eddy
 Foster's Home for Imaginary Friends
 The Flintstones
 The Grim Adventures of Billy & Mandy
 I Am Weasel
 The Jetsons
 Johnny Bravo
 Justice League
 Justice League Unlimited
 Looney Tunes
 The Marvelous Misadventures of Flapjack
 Naruto Shippuden
 Pokémon
 The Powerpuff Girls
 Samurai Jack
 The Scooby-Doo Show
 Scooby-Doo, Where Are You!
 Sonic X
 Tom and Jerry
 Teenage Mutant Ninja Turtles
 Teenage Mutant Ninja Turtles: Fast Forward
 TMNT: Back to the Sewer
 What's New, Scooby-Doo?                              
 Yu-Gi-Oh!
 Yu-Gi-Oh! GX
 Yu-Gi-Oh! 5D's

Animated series 
 101 Dalmatians (101 Dalmatët)
 Bubble Marin (Flluska Marin)
 The Angry Beavers (Kastorët e Zemëruar)
 A.T.O.M. - Alpha Teens on Machines (ATOM: Një skuadër në aksion)
 Big Hero 6: The Series (6 heronjtë)
 Bugs Bunny (Bags Bani)
 CatDog (Maçoku-Qen)
 Lucky Fred (Fredi me fat)
 The Flintstones (Familja Flintston)
 Home: Adventures with Tip & Oh (Aventurat e Dyshes Tip dhe O)
 Hotel Transylvania: The Series (Hotel Transilvania Seriali)
 Julius Jr. (Xhuliusi i Vogël)
 Kate & Mim-Mim (Kejti dhe Mim Mimi)
 Moby Dick and Mighty Mightor (Mobi Dik dhe Majti Majtor)
 Naruto (Naruto)
 One Piece (Piratët e Vegjël)
 Phineas and Ferb (Fines dhe Ferb)
 Puppy Dog Pals (Qenushët)
 Rob the Robot (Rob Roboti)
 Shimmer and Shine (Shimeri dhe Shajni)
 Spike: The World of Santa Claus (Spajki: Bota e Santa Klaus)
 Teamo Supremo (Skuadra ?, complete title unknown for now)
 The Lion Guard (Garda e Luanit)
 Thomas & Friends (Tomas Lokomotiva dhe Shokët)
 Tutenstein (only aired once in 2007)

Former programming

Live-action series
 Club 57 (TV series)
 Chica vampiro
 Coop & Cami Ask the World
 L.A. 7
 Life with Derek
 Lizzie McGuire
 Liv and Maddie
 Kally's Mashup
 Kamen Rider: Dragon Knight
 K.C. Undercover
 Mighty Morphin Power Rangers
 Noobees
 Hannah Montana
 House of Anubis
 Patito Feo (TV series)
 Power Rangers Beast Morphers
 Power Rangers Dino Charge
 Power Rangers Dino Fury
 Power Rangers Dino Thunder
 Power Rangers in Space
 Power Rangers Jungle Fury
 Power Rangers Lost Galaxy
 Power Rangers Lightspeed Rescue
 Power Rangers Megaforce
 Power Rangers Mystic Force
 Power Rangers Ninja Steel
 Power Rangers Ninja Storm
 Power Rangers Operation Overdrive
 Power Rangers RPM
 Power Rangers Samurai
 Power Rangers S.P.D.
 Power Rangers Time Force
 Power Rangers Turbo
 Power Rangers Wild Force
 Power Rangers Zeo
 The Lodge (TV series)
 Sabrina the Teenage Witch (1996 TV series)
 Soy Luna
 Sueña conmigo

Acquired series
 Disney Fam Jam

Animated series
 The 7D (7 Xhuxhat) (2017-2021)
 All Hail King Julien (Rroftë Mbreti Xhuljan)
 American Dragon: Jake Long (Dragoi Amerikan Xhek Long) (2010-2011)
 Angry Birds Toons (Zogjtë e Zemëruar Tuns)
 Barney & Friends (Barni dhe miqtë) (2010-2021)
 Bluey (Blui)
 Bubble Guppies (Sirenat Gazmore) (2022-present
 Cone Control (Qendra e Kontrollit të Koneve) (2013-2021)
 Danny Phantom (Fantazma Deni)
 Dora and Friends: Into the City (Aventurat e Dorës dhe miqve të Saj)
 Dora the Explorer (Dora eksploruesja)
 Dragon Ball (Sferat e Dragoit)
 Dragon Ball Z (Sferat e Dragoit Z)
 Emma's Theatre (Teatri i Emës)
 Fred & Fiona (Fredi dhe Fiona)
 Gombby's Green Island (Gombi)
 Handy Manny (Meni Duararti) (2010-2021)
 Mickey Mouse Clubhouse (Klubi i Miushit Miki, or simply Miushi Miki)
 Jackie Chan Adventures (Aventurat e Xheki Çan)
 JoJo's Circus (Jojo dhe Cirku i Mrekullueshëm)
 Loonatics Unleashed (Lunatikë i shfrenuar)
 The Loud House (Shtëpia e Zhurmshme)
 One Piece (Piratët e Vegjël)
 Patta Potta Monta (Të Bëhesh I Egër)
 Raven's Home (Shtëpia e Rejven)
 Spectacular Spider-Man (Merimangë-Man Spektakolar)
 Spider-Man (Merimangë-Man)
 SpongeBob SquarePants (Bob Sfungjeri Patallona-Katrori) (2016-present)
 Star Wars Rebels (Lufta e Yjeve Rebelët) 
 Tak and the Power of Juju (Tak dhe Fuqia e Xhuxhu) (2010-2020)
 Teen Titans Go! (Forca Titanët e Rinj)
 The Tom and Jerry Show (1975) (Shfaqja e Tomit dhe Xherrit)
 Transformers: Robots in Disguise (Transformatorët Robotët në Maskim)
 Turtle Hero (Breshka Hero) (also on RTSH Fëmijë)
 VeggieTales (Perimet) (2007-2020)
 Vipo: Adventures of the Flying Dog (Vipo: Aventurat e Qenit Fluturues) (2010-2020)
 Wallykazam! (Ualikazam!)
 Wander Over Yonder (Shëtitësi i Universit)
 Wizards of Waverly Place (Magjistarët e Sheshit Uejverli)
 Wooly (Uli)
 Yo Gabba Gabba! (Unë Gaba Gaba!)
 Zenki (Zenki)

References

Çufo